England national basketball team may refer to:
England men's national basketball team
England women's national basketball team
England men's national under-18 basketball team
England men's national under-16 basketball team
England women's national under-20 basketball team
England women's national under-18 basketball team
England women's national under-16 basketball team